Joseph A. Scanlon (1901 – April 1957) was a Democratic member of the Pennsylvania House of Representatives, serving from 1935 to 1952. In 1951, he was elected clerk of courts in Philadelphia.

References

External links
Joseph A. Scanlon's obituary

Politicians from Philadelphia
Democratic Party members of the Pennsylvania House of Representatives
1901 births
1957 deaths
20th-century American politicians